Buddha Sounds are an Argentine electronic music group created by the Argentine producer Alex Seoan in 2002.
The band consists of Alex Seoan (guitar, keyboards, samplers and voice); Maia Krasnaia (voice and violin); J. Fernández (drums); Anubis Rha (bass), Kantik (dancer and vocals), Shankari (dancer and vocals) and Yana (vocals)

Up until now, the band has five studio albums released by the Label Music Brokers in Argentina, and by Warner Music in Spain.

Some of Buddha Sounds tracks made appearance in the big screen. In 2010, the song 'Odna', from Buddha Sounds fourth album 'Inner', was included in the movie 'Sex and the city 2', the last film based on the HBO TV show. The same year, 'Xanadu', from 'Buddha Sounds II', appeared in the American/Israeli co-production 'After the Cup: Sons of Sakhnin United'.

Buddha Sounds has performed in Ecuador, Peru, Venezuela, and Argentina.

Discography 

Buddha Sounds I (2002)
 The Search Is Over [Original Edit] - Eli Kazah
 Aldalá [Andaluz Mix] - Amira Alaf
 You Are the Sunshine [Vocal Mix] - Lazy Action
 Juice [Alex's Remix] - Deep B.
 Tibet's Sun [Buddha Edit] - Biyaba
 Return Home [Tee2 Remix] - Eli Kazah
 Myati [Deep Sounds Edit] - Orleya
 Mope Okerh [Soviet Remix] - Zoia Vitkovskaia
 Into the Universe [Eternal Dub Mix] - Freedom Dub feat. Caroline Chrem
 Kashmir Ju-Ju [Kevin's Abstract Mix] - First Street
 Sanctis [Paul's Remix] - Le Griser
 Ishtar [Original Mix] - São Vicente
 Deep Stuff, Pt. 2 - Mariscal Foch
 Miracle City [Overground Mix] - Love Reprise

 Buddha Sounds II "The Arabic Dream" (2003)
 Sinsym Flight [Amanjena Mix] - Meloscience Corp.
 Please Say Goodbye - Dew
 Under the Sun [Original Mix] - Orleya
 All My Dreams - Miss Hansen
 The Love Supreme - Lila Liu feat. Djamal
 Xanadu [Mamouinia Edit] - Desert Blend
 Let Me Go - Eli Kazah
 Nair - Dew
 I'm Missing You [Still Missing Remix] - Uschi
 Flash - Freedom Dub
 A Special Gift [Mystic Mix] - Love Reprise
 Why - Seoan
 On Ledianói - Maia Krasnaia
 Snow Desert - Speechless Project
 Far from Paradise [Heaven Voices Mix] - Seoan
 Out of My Life - Uschi

 Buddha Sounds III "Chill In Tibet" (2003)
 Beyond This Time [Landscape Mix] - feat. Ahy'o
 In My World - feat. Dew (Oriental vocals by: Shankari Lasya)
 If I Love You - feat. Uschi
 Khandhalha [Alidi Remix] - feat. Amira Alaf
 If We Are to Survive - feat. Lila Liu
 All the Same [Tribe Beat Mix] - feat. Ahy'o
 What Is Right? [Downtempo Remix] - feat. Kantik
 To Shto Moio - feat. Maia Krasnaia
 Thinking of You [Vocal Mix] - feat. Lila Liu
 Eyes Closed - feat. Ahy'o
 Some Days [Pangean Mix] - feat. Lila Liu
 Shine One [Original Edit] - feat. Ahy'o
 I Will Try - feat. Urselle
 All I Need [Lovin' Mix] - feat. Lila Liu

 Buddha Sounds IV "Inner" (2007)
 Inner [Rajesh Mix]
 Don't Blow Away - feat. Ahy'o
 14 KMS [Original Mix]
 The Signs - feat. Uschi
 Lucecita [Kenko Edit]
 Mystery Of God - feat. Seoan
 A Little More Light [Spice Dub] - feat. Ahy'o
 Dakhenha - feat. Kantik & Shankari Lasya
 Infralow [Sitartronix] - feat. Ahy'o
 Research [Andalusi Mix] - feat. Ahy'o
 Odna - feat. Maia Krasnaia
 Nag Mandala [Introspective Tàlam]

 Buddha Sounds V "New Mantrams" (2009)
 Ganesha Sunset - feat. Kantik
 You Know - feat. Ahy'o
 Everything You Need [Drum & Dub]
 Kiss You [Hindi Breaks] - feat. Ahy'o
 Konark (Melapalayam & Rajesh Mix)
 Open Your Eyes - feat. Maia Krasnaia
 Time (Surise Mix) - feat. Ahy'o
 Vinoba Road (Mantrams Beats)
 Lucky Girl - feat. Ahy'o
 Davay - feat. Maia Krasnaia
 Bhubaneshwar (Rajesh Mix)
 Ganesha Sunset (Minimal Sound)

 Buddha Sounds VI "Guest in the Universe" (2011)
 Nederdsza - feat. Mitali Chinara
 Superficial - feat. Yana
 Cuando Te Vas - feat. Laura Peralta
 Don't Forget Me
 Listen To Me - feat. Seoan & Yana
 Tonight
 Funny Lover - feat. Yana & Seoan
 I See You - feat. Yana
 My Life - feat. Seoan
 Wish
 The Last Meditation
 Submeditation

Awards 

Buddha Sounds II has won the Gardel Awards on the Best Electronic Music Album category.
New Mantrams has been nominated for Gardel Awards 2010 on the Best Electronic Music Album category.

References 

Diario Hoy para LatinoAmérica 
Guayaquil Caliente - Portal de Turismo

External links 
Buddha Sounds Official Web Site
Buddha Sounds' Myspace
Buddha Sounds' Facebook

Ambient music groups
Argentine musical groups
Trip hop groups